Rutela formosa, the handsome flower scarab, is a species of shining leaf chafer in the family of beetles known as Scarabaeidae.

References

Further reading

 
 
 

Rutelinae
Articles created by Qbugbot
Beetles described in 1844